Marita Theodora Catharina Mathijsen-Verkooijen (born 8 August 1944 in Belfeld) is professor of modern Dutch literature at the University of Amsterdam, with her speciality as the literature of the nineteenth century in the Netherlands.

She is also editor in chief of the periodical De Negentiende Eeuw (The Nineteenth Century) and has many editions on the nineteenth-century Dutch classics. Apart from that she wrote various books on that period.

References

1944 births
Living people
People from Venlo
Academic staff of the University of Amsterdam